Bayad is one of the 182 Legislative Assembly constituencies of Gujarat state in India.

It is part of Aravalli district.

List of segments
This assembly seat represents the following segments:

 Bayad Taluka30
 Malpur Taluka8

Members of Legislative Assembly
1962 - 1967 { Lalsinh Kishorsinh Rahevar }  (SWA)
1967 - 1972 { Lalsinh Kishorsinh Rahevar }  (SWA)
1972 - 1975 { Lalsinh Kishorsinh Rahevar }  (NCO)
1975 - 1980. { Lalsinh Kishorsinh Rahevar }  (INC)
1980 -1985 Ramsinh Rupsinh Solanki (INC)
2007 - Udesinh Zala, Bharatiya Janata Party
2012 - Mahendrasinh Vaghela, Indian National Congress

Election results

2022

2019

2017

2012

See also
 List of constituencies of the Gujarat Legislative Assembly
 Aravalli district

References

External links
 

Assembly constituencies of Gujarat
Aravalli district